Jaime Alfonso Ruiz (born January 3, 1984) is a Colombian football forward, who last played for Heist in the Belgian Second Division.

Club career
Ruiz previously played for Alianza Atlético and Cienciano in the Primera Division Peruana. He scored 18 goals in the 2008/09, although the Belgian league website lists his tally as 17. This is because of an error they make in counting his goal , but failing to add it to his total. . His club website also lists 18 goals.

International career
He played with the Colombia  U-20 at the 2003 FIFA World Youth Championship in UAE, helping Colombia team finish 3rd by beating Argentina 2–1.

References

External links 

1984 births
Living people
Footballers from Cali
Colombian footballers
Colombia under-20 international footballers
Colombia international footballers
Cortuluá footballers
S.D. Aucas footballers
Deportivo Pasto footballers
Cienciano footballers
Alianza Atlético footballers
K.V.C. Westerlo players
K.V. Mechelen players
K.S.K. Heist players
Categoría Primera A players
Peruvian Primera División players
Belgian Pro League players
Challenger Pro League players
Colombian expatriate footballers
Expatriate footballers in Peru
Colombian expatriate sportspeople in Peru
Expatriate footballers in Belgium
Colombian expatriate sportspeople in Belgium
Association football forwards